This is a list of professional wrestling hall of fames. There are many pro wrestling-related halls of fame. Most are (or were) run by a particular promotion, often honoring alumni of that promotion or its predecessors, though some are independent. Most professional wrestling halls of fame do not have a physical building, existing instead merely as a "conceptual" hall of fame, with a notable exception being the Professional Wrestling Hall of Fame and Museum founded in Amsterdam, New York.

Halls of fame

General

Continental

National

Regional

Promotions

Type

Journalistic

See also
 List of professional wrestling awards

References
Specific

General

External links 
Wrestling Hall of Fames at Cagematch.net
Wrestling Hall of Fames at OnlineWorldofWrestling.com

Halls of fame